The Source Presents: Hip Hop Hits, Volume 6 is the sixth annual music compilation album to be contributed by The Source magazine.  Released December 10, 2002, and distributed by Def Jam Recordings, Hip Hop Hits Volume 6 features eighteen hip hop and rap hits.  It went to number 31 on the Top R&B/Hip Hop Albums chart and number 35 on the Billboard 200 album chart (the highest peak of any The Source Presents album on the latter).

Two songs, "I Need a Girl (Part II)" and "Oh Boy", reached the number-one peak on the Hot Rap Tracks chart with the latter also reaching number one on the Hot R&B/Hip-Hop Songs chart.  This is the fourth Hip Hop Hits compilation not to feature a number-one Hot 100/pop hit.

Track listing
I Need a Girl (Part Two) - P. Diddy, Ginuwine, Loon, Mario Winans and Tammy Ruggieri
#1 - Nelly
Down 4 U - Ja Rule, Ashanti, Charli Baltimore and Vita
Oh Boy - Cam'ron and Juelz Santana
Guess Who's Back - Scarface, Jay-Z and Beanie Sigel  
Pass the Courvoisier (remix) - Busta Rhymes, P. Diddy and Pharrell  
Roc the Mic - Beanie Sigel and Freeway  
Without Me - Eminem 
Still Fly - Big Tymers  
What's Luv? - Fat Joe, Ja Rule and Ashanti
Boottee (remix) - Benzino, G. Dep and Fabolous
Nothin' - N.O.R.E.  
Stylin' - Foxy Brown 
Good Times - Styles P
Welcome to Atlanta (remix) - Jermaine Dupri, P. Diddy, Snoop Dogg and Murphy Lee 
Rollout (My Business) - Ludacris  
Say I Yi Yi - Ying Yang Twins  
Grindin' - Clipse, N.O.R.E., Baby and Lil Wayne

References

Hip hop compilation albums
2002 compilation albums
Def Jam Recordings compilation albums